The following is a timeline of the history of the city of Mecca, Saudi Arabia.

Prior to 20th century

 100 BCE - "Yemeni tribes of Jurham rule Mecca."
 570 CE - Year of the Elephant and the birth of prophet Muhammad.
 605 CE - Quraish rebuild Kaaba after it was damaged in floods.
 613 CE - "Prophet Muhammad begins public preaching in Mecca."
 622 CE / 0-1 H - Muhammad migrates from Mecca to Medina, with followers (muhajirun).
 7th C. - Masjid al-Haram architectural components began.
 625-629 : Pilgrim Mosques built in numerous countries like (Kerala) India & in China by first disciples of Prophet.
Pilgrimage of Muslims to Mecca per Treaty of Hudaybiyyah.
 11 December: Liberation of Mecca.
 683 / 63-64 H - Siege of Mecca (683); Kaaba burnt.
 692 - Siege of Mecca (692).
 793 - Harun al-Rashid visits city.
 810 - Aqueduct built.
 930 - City sacked by Qarmatians; Black Stone taken out of Mecca.
 951 - Black Stone returned to Mecca "for a great ransom".
 1184 - Traveller Ibn Jubayr visits city.
 1265 - Egyptian Mamluks in power.
 1326 - Traveller Ibn Battuta visits Mecca.
 1517 - Ottomans in power; Selim I becomes Custodian of the Two Holy Mosques.
 1630 - Flood.
 1631 - Kaaba rebuilt.
 1802/1803 - Mecca "captured by the Sa'udi-Wahhabi army."
 1812/1813 - Wahhabis ousted by Egyptian forces.
 1840 - Ottomans in power again.
 1878 - Population estimated by Assistant-Surgeon ʽAbd el-Razzāq at 50,000 to 60,000.
 1880 - 21 March: Sharif assassinated.
 1885 - Population: 45,000 (estimate).
 1886 - Printing press in use (approximate date).

20th century

 1908 / 1325-1326 H
 September: Hejaz Railway (Damascus-Mecca) begins operating.
 Hussein bin Ali becomes sharif.
 Al-Hijaz government newspaper begins publication.
 1912 - Madrasat al-Falah established.
 1916 / 1334-1335 H
 June–July: Battle of Mecca (1916).
 Hashimite al-Qibla government newspaper begins publication.
 1921 - Population: 80,000 (approximate estimate).
 1924 / 1342-1343 H
 Battle of Mecca (1924).
 12 December: Umm al-Qura government newspaper begins publication.
 Population: 60,000 (approximate estimate).
 Ali of Hejaz becomes sharif.
 1925 - City becomes part of the Kingdom of Saudi Arabia.
 1926 - Al Adl cemetery and al-Mahad al-Ilmi Suudi (school) established.
 1929 - Amanat al-Asima (municipality) established.
 1931 / 1349-1350 H - Public library founded (approximate date).
 1932 - Dar al-Hadith (school) established.
 1930s - Aziziyya, Faysaliyya, Khayriyya, and Suudiyya schools established (approximate date).
 1938 - Maktabat al-Haram (library) active.
1941 - Flood
 1945 - Al-Wehda Club (sport club) formed.
 1949 / 1368-1369 H - Kulliyyat al-Sharia (college) established.
 1951 - College of Education established.
 1958 - Al Nadwa newspaper begins publication.
 1960 - Police academy established.
 1962
 Slavery abolished.
 Population: 158,908.
 1964 / 1383-1384 H
 Malcolm X visits city.
 Masjid al-Haram expanded.
 1966 - Mahad al-Nur (school) established.
1969 - Flood.
 1972 - Hajj televised.
 1973 - "Master Plan for the Holy City of Mecca" launched.
 1974 - Population: 366,801.
 1975 - Fire in Mina.
 1979 - 20 November-4 December: Grand Mosque seizure.
 1981 - Umm al-Qura University established.
 1986 - King Abdul Aziz Stadium opens.
 1987 - 31 July: 1987 Mecca incident.
 1992 - Population: 965,697.
 1997 - 16 April: Mecca fire of 1997.

21st century

 2005 - April: 2005 Islamic Solidarity Games held in city.
 2006 / 1426-1427 H
 5 January: 2006 Mecca hostel collapse.
 12 January: 2006 Hajj stampede.
 December: Abraj al Bait Mall in business.
 2007 - Jamaraat Bridge for pedestrians rebuilt.
 2010
 Al Mashaaer Al Mugaddassah Metro begins operating.
 Makkah Clock Royal Tower Hotel in business.
 1,534,731.
 2012
 August: Fourth Extraordinary Session of the Islamic Summit Conference held in city.
 Abraj Al Bait built.
 2013 - Mishaal bin Abdullah Al Saud becomes governor of Mecca Province.
 2014 / 1435-1436 H - Raffles Makkah Palace hotel and Swissôtel Makkah in business.
 2015
 13 July: City visible via Snapchat imagery.
 September: Mecca crane collapse.

See also
 Mecca history
 List of sharifs of Mecca
 Timeline of Muhammad in Mecca
 Timeline of Islamic history
 Timelines of other cities in Saudi Arabia: Jeddah, Medina, Riyadh

References

Bibliography

Published in 18th-19th centuries
 
 
 
 
 
 , v.2
 
 
 

Published in 20th century
 
 
 
 
  (fulltext)
 
 
 
 Francis Edward Peters. Mecca: A Literary History of the Muslim Holy Land, Princeton University Press,  (1994)
 
 
 

Published in 21st century

External links

 Map of Mecca, 1946
 
 
 Europeana. Items related to Mecca, various dates
 Digital Public Library of America. Items related to Mecca, various dates
 

Years in Saudi Arabia
 
Mecca